30330 may refer to:
 30330, a ZIP code for Atlanta, Georgia, United States
 30330, a postal code for Gard, France
 30330, an SMS Short code linked to the Joe Biden 2020 presidential campaign
 30330 Tiffanysun, a main-belt asteroid